Stephanie McIntosh (born 5 July 1985) is an Australian actress and singer. She played the role of Sky Mangel in the Australian soap opera Neighbours from 2003 to 2007. She made a brief appearance for one episode in 2015 as part of the show's 30th anniversary celebrations, and returned again in 2020 as part of the shows 35th anniversary episodes, and a cameo appearance in 2022. As a singer, she released her debut album, Tightrope, in September 2006. It peaked at No. 4 on the ARIA Albums Chart.

Early life and education
Stephanie McIntosh was born on 5 July 1985 and grew up in Malvern, Victoria. Her father is John McIntosh and her mother is Sue McIntosh (née Menlove), a former TV actress and ABC newsreader. McIntosh has two older sisters, Katherine and Olivia. Her half-brother is actor and singer Jason Donovan from her mother's previous marriage to actor Terence Donovan.

McIntosh attended Firbank and then Melbourne Girls Grammar School, where she recalled "I involved myself in every play and every musical and I did drama classes." She left during Year 12 to start her acting career. As a teenager, she worked in a musical with stand-up comedian and part-time dancer, Tommy Dassalo.

Career

2001–2007: Acting career and Neighbours
McIntosh's acting debut was in the film The Wilde Girls (2001) as Carrie, alongside Olivia Newton-John. She followed with a role on Australian kids' TV show, The Legacy of the Silver Shadow (2002). In 2003 McIntosh became a regular on Australian soap opera Neighbours playing the character Sky Mangel. Her half-brother, Jason Donovan, had also acted in Neighbours from 1986 to 1989. Growing up, she was neighbours with Alan Fletcher and was invited to the set by him, prior to acting alongside him. For McIntosh's performance in Neighbours, she was nominated for the "Most Popular New Female Talent" award at the 46th Annual TV Week Logie Awards held in 2004. She was also nominated for "Favorite Hottie" at the Nickelodeon Kids' Choice Awards. After filming over 500 episodes, she left Neighbours in April 2007 to focus on her singing career.

2004–2007: Music career
McIntosh's music career began in 2004 when her version of the song "Santa Claus Is Coming to Town" was included on the album The Spirit of Christmas 2004. She recorded her debut demo single, "Happiest Day of My Life", in March 2005.

In April 2006, McIntosh signed a multi-album deal with Universal Music Australia.

The two years that McIntosh spent making the album was turned into a reality TV show The Steph Show, produced by Tom Nichols and Arnon Woolfson. The show debuted on Network Ten on 28 July 2006, the day before the release of her debut single, "Mistake", and finished on 15 September 2006, the date the music video for her second single Tightrope was released.

Her debut single, "Mistake", was released on 29 July 2006 and premiered on Australian radio on 26 June 2006. It debuted on the ARIA Charts at #3, and was certified Gold in August 2006, with shipments of over 35,000 units.

"Tightrope", the second single to be lifted off the album, made the Australian top 20. The album debuted and peaked at #4 on the ARIA Charts and at #1 on the Australasian Charts and was also accredited Gold.

The third single, written by McIntosh, "So Do I Say Sorry First?", was not as successful as her previous singles, peaking at number #34 on the ARIA Singles Chart.

A special re-packaged edition of the album Tightrope was released on 19 March 2007. At her appearance on Habbo Hotel on 8 March 2007 McIntosh confirmed that the re-packaged edition will feature remixes of the singles released from Tightrope as well as the bonus track "Catching My Breath". She also confirmed that a second season of The Steph Show was in the pipeline. In mid-May 2007, she released her demo single, "In My Skin". McIntosh was also nominated for "Spankin' New Artist" at the 2006 MTV Australia Video Music Awards, at which she also performed "So Do I Say Sorry First?" Due to no musical backing on the night, her performance was cut from later screenings of the show.

McIntosh performed at university bars and nightclubs across the UK from September to November 2007 to build her popularity there.

2008–present: Further acting roles 
McIntosh was approached in 2008 to appear on Dancing with the Stars in Australia; however, she has not appeared in the series.

In May 2008, the Herald Sun reported that McIntosh had been in Los Angeles, meeting with potential agents and managers. She auditioned for roles in Transformers: Revenge of the Fallen (2009), the CBS mini-series Harper's Island, and Beverly Hills, 90210, but failed to secure them.

McIntosh appeared in the thriller Liars All (2013) as Casey Kass, and in Red Herring (2014) as Charlie, which co-starred former Neighbours castmate Holly Valance.

McIntosh reprised the role of Sky Mangel in Neighbours for one episode in 2015, as part of the show's 30th-anniversary celebrations. She was heavily pregnant at the time, and her return had initially been set up as a one-month role.

After a five-year acting career hiatus, McIntosh reprised her role on Neighbours as Sky Mangel on a recurring basis in 2020. Sky also appeared in the last-ever episode, broadcast on 29 July 2022, though McIntosh was not seen in the UK broadcast.

Personal life 
McIntosh dated AFL star Nick Riewoldt for four-and-a-half years, breaking up in late 2009.

In March 2014, she began dating Peter Hieatt, a landscape designer. They have two daughters: Milla (born December 2014) and Goldie Grace (born October 2018).

Filmography

Awards and recognition

Discography

Studio albums

Singles

Music videos

References

External links

 Official UK Website

Place of birth missing (living people)
1985 births
Living people
Australian television actresses
Actresses from Melbourne
Singers from Melbourne
21st-century Australian singers
21st-century Australian women singers
People educated at Melbourne Girls Grammar
People from Malvern, Victoria